In four-dimensional Euclidean geometry, the cantitruncated 24-cell honeycomb is a uniform space-filling honeycomb. It can be seen as a cantitruncation of the regular 24-cell honeycomb, containing truncated tesseract, cantitruncated 24-cell, and tetrahedral prism cells.

Alternate names
 Cantelltaed icositetrachoric tetracomb/honeycomb
 Great rhombated icositetrachoric tetracomb (gricot)
 Great prismatodisicositetrachoric tetracomb

Related honeycombs

See also 
Regular and uniform honeycombs in 4-space:
Tesseractic honeycomb
16-cell honeycomb
24-cell honeycomb
Rectified 24-cell honeycomb
Snub 24-cell honeycomb
5-cell honeycomb
Truncated 5-cell honeycomb
Omnitruncated 5-cell honeycomb

References 
 Coxeter, H.S.M. Regular Polytopes, (3rd edition, 1973), Dover edition,  p. 296, Table II: Regular honeycombs
 Kaleidoscopes: Selected Writings of H.S.M. Coxeter, edited by F. Arthur Sherk, Peter McMullen, Anthony C. Thompson, Asia Ivic Weiss, Wiley-Interscience Publication, 1995,  
 (Paper 24) H.S.M. Coxeter, Regular and Semi-Regular Polytopes III, [Math. Zeit. 200 (1988) 3-45]
 George Olshevsky, Uniform Panoploid Tetracombs, Manuscript (2006) (Complete list of 11 convex uniform tilings, 28 convex uniform honeycombs, and 143 convex uniform tetracombs) Model 114
  o3o3x4x3x - gricot - O114

5-polytopes
Honeycombs (geometry)
Truncated tilings